The Thomaston-Upson County School District is a public school district in Upson County, Georgia, United States, based in Thomaston. It serves the communities of Hannahs Mill, Lincoln Park, Salem, Sunset Village, The Rock, Thomaston, and Yatesville.

Schools
The Thomaston-Upson County School District has two elementary schools, one middle school, and one high school.

Elementary schools
Upson-Lee Primary School
Upson-Lee Elementary School

Middle school
Upson-Lee Middle School

High school
Upson-Lee High School

References

External links

School districts in Georgia (U.S. state)
Education in Upson County, Georgia